UOL Group Limited, is a Singaporean headquartered company focusing on investment, development and management of real estate across the Asia-Pacific region. The Wee Family, significant shareholders of United Overseas Bank are the largest shareholders of the company. The company is a constituent member of the Straits Times Index.

History 

The company was founded in 1963 as Faber Union Limited, a subsidiary of Faber Union (HK) Limited. Singapore Exchange It became a publicly traded company in 1964.

In 1975, the company changed its name to United Overseas Land Limited after Wee Cho Yaw and United Overseas Bank acquired a controlling interest in the company in 1973.

In 2002, the company acquired Parkroyal, a hotel and property company.

In 2006, the company was renamed to UOL Group Limited.

In 2007, UOL Group Limited acquired Pan Pacific Hotels and Resorts from the Tokyu Group, and renamed it to Pan Pacific Hotels Group. The company then Parkroyal with Pan Pacific for its hotel brand.

In 2013, the company decided to delist Pan Pacific Hotels and Resorts from the Singapore Exchange.

In 2018, the company acquired Singapore Land Group Limited (SingLand).

Group structure

The company has the following business segments: 

 Property development – development of properties for sale
 Property investments – leasing of commercial properties and serviced suites
 Hotel operations – operation of owned hotels
 Investments – investment in quoted and unquoted financial assets
 Technology operations – the distribution of computers and related products
 Management services – provision of hotel management services

Notable properties
Properties that the company currently owned or previously owned include: 
 Heron Plaza
 Mandarin Oriental, Singapore
 Marina Square
 Pan Pacific Singapore Hotel
 Pan Pacific Sonargaon
 Pan Pacific Suzhou
 Parkroyal Collection Pickering
 Parkroyal Collection Marina Bay, Singapore
 The Plaza
 West Mall

References

External links 
 

Real estate companies of Singapore
Housing in Singapore
Multinational companies headquartered in Singapore
Financial services companies established in 1963
1963 establishments in Singapore

Companies listed on the Singapore Exchange
Singaporean brands
Singaporean companies established in 1963